Ernest Frederick Parker (5 November 1883 – 2 May 1918) was an Australian tennis player and cricketer.

Career
Ernie Parker was educated at Perth High School and St Peter's College, Adelaide, before joining his father's law firm in Perth.

Tennis
Parker is best remembered for winning the 1913 Australasian Championships men's singles title. In the final against Harry Parker, he made many successful forays to the net and he won in four sets. He also reached the final in 1909 and won the 1909 (partnering J. Keane) and 1913 (partnering Alf Hedeman) doubles titles.

He won the Western Australian Championships six times: 1903, 1904, 1907, 1908, 1911 and 1912. In 1905 he won the Maerenbad Cup in Marienbad Brandenberg, Germany, on clay, beating Kurt von Wessely.

Parker's play was described as "quick, wristy, and always looking for a 'winner'". Slightly built, he was noted for his exceptional net play, but his serve was his weakness, described as "merely a means of putting the ball into play".

Cricket
Parker was able to excel at both tennis and cricket because at the time tennis was mostly a winter game in Perth. He played cricket for East Perth (Perth Cricket Club) and Wanderers in the Western Australian Grade Cricket competition. An elegant batsman, he was the first player to score a double-century in senior Perth cricket, and set a long-standing record of 19 centuries in the competition.

He represented Western Australia in first-class cricket between 1905 and 1910 in the years before Western Australia joined the Sheffield Shield competition. He was the first player to score a first-class century for Western Australia, when he made 116 in his second match. He also made 117 in only 82 minutes against Victoria in 1910. He was included in two trial matches to select the Australian team to tour England in 1909, but without success.

War service and death
Despite failing eyesight, which had affected his later sporting career, Parker enlisted in the Australian army in World War I. A gunner in the 102 Howitzer Battery, 2nd Brigade, he was killed by an enemy shell on 2 May 1918 in Caëstre, France.

Grand Slam finals

Singles 2 (1 title, 1 runner-up)

Doubles: 2 (2 titles)

References

External links 
 
 Bud Collins: Total Tennis – The Ultimate Tennis Encyclopedia (2003 Edition). See pages 782 and 814.
 

1883 births
1918 deaths
People educated at Perth High School
People educated at St Peter's College, Adelaide
Australasian Championships (tennis) champions
Australian military personnel killed in World War I
Australian male tennis players
Australian cricketers
Sportsmen from Western Australia
Tennis players from Perth, Western Australia
Western Australia cricketers
Grand Slam (tennis) champions in men's singles
Grand Slam (tennis) champions in men's doubles
Cricketers from Western Australia
Australian Army soldiers